WKGT-LP (104.7 FM) is a radio station licensed to North Adams, Massachusetts, United States, the station serves the Pittsfield area. The station is currently owned by Gospel Train Ministry.

References

External links
 

KGT-LP
Gospel radio stations in the United States
Radio stations established in 2004
2004 establishments in Massachusetts
North Adams, Massachusetts
Mass media in Berkshire County, Massachusetts
KGT-LP